Antonio Pribanić (born 13 December 1987 in Rijeka) is a Croatian handballer who plays for RK Poreč.

Career 
He started playing handball in his hometown club RK Kvarner. After loans to RK Senj and RK Umag he moved to RK Bjelovar.

In 2015 he won the league and cup titles of Romania with Baia Mare.

Achievements 
RK Umag
Croatian Second League – West:
Winner: 2008
RK Bjelovar
Croatian Premier League:
Bronze Medalist: 2011
SC Pick Szeged
Hungarian League:
Silver Medalist: 2012, 2013
Hungarian Cup:
Finalist: 2012, 2013
HCM Minaur Baia Mare
Romanian National League:
Winner: 2015
Romanian Cup:
Winner: 2015
Individual
Polish Superliga best line player: 2013–14

References 

1987 births
Croatian male handball players
Living people
RK Kvarner players
Handball players from Rijeka
Croatian expatriate sportspeople in Hungary
Croatian expatriate sportspeople in Poland
Croatian expatriate sportspeople in Romania 
Expatriate handball players